Afribactrus is a monotypic genus of African dwarf spiders containing the single species, Afribactrus stylifrons. It was first described by J. Wunderlich & V. Nicolai in 1995, and has only been found in South Africa.

See also
 List of Linyphiidae species

References

Endemic fauna of South Africa
Linyphiidae
Monotypic Araneomorphae genera
Spiders of South Africa